Leonard Bernstein (August 25, 1918 – October 14, 1990) was an American conductor, composer, pianist, music educator, author, and humanitarian. Considered to be one of the most important conductors of his time, he was the first American conductor to receive international acclaim. According to music critic Donal Henahan, he was "one of the most prodigiously talented and successful musicians in American history". Bernstein was the recipient of many honors, including seven Emmy Awards, two Tony Awards, sixteen Grammy Awards including the Lifetime Achievement Award, and the Kennedy Center Honor.

As a composer he wrote in many genres, including symphonic and orchestral music, ballet, film and theatre music, choral works, opera, chamber music and works for the piano. His best-known work is the Broadway musical West Side Story, which continues to be regularly performed worldwide, and has been adapted into two (1961 and 2021) feature films. His works include three symphonies, Chichester Psalms, Serenade after Plato's "Symposium", the original score for the film On the Waterfront, and theater works including On the Town, Wonderful Town, Candide, and his MASS.

Bernstein was the first American-born conductor to lead a major American symphony orchestra. He was music director of the New York Philharmonic and conducted the world's major orchestras, generating a significant legacy of audio and video recordings. He was also a critical figure in the modern revival of the music of Gustav Mahler, in whose music he was most passionately interested. A skilled pianist, he often conducted piano concertos from the keyboard. He was the first conductor to share and explore classical music on television with a mass audience. Through dozens of national and international broadcasts, including Young People's Concerts with the New York Philharmonic, he sought to make music both intelligible and enjoyable to all. Through his educational efforts, including several books and the creation of two major international music festivals, he influenced several generations of young musicians.

A lifelong humanitarian, Bernstein worked in support of civil rights; protested against the Vietnam War; advocated nuclear disarmament; raised money for HIV/AIDS research and awareness; and engaged in multiple international initiatives for human rights and world peace. Near the end of his life, he conducted an historic performance of Beethoven's Symphony No. 9 in Berlin to celebrate the fall of the Berlin Wall. The concert was televised live, worldwide, on Christmas Day, 1989.

Early life and education

1918–1934: Early life and family 
Born Louis Bernstein in Lawrence, Massachusetts, he was the son of Ukrainian-Jewish parents, Jennie (née Resnick) and Samuel Joseph Bernstein, both of whom immigrated to the United States from Rivne (now in Ukraine). His grandmother insisted that his first name be Louis, but his parents always called him Leonard. He legally changed his name to Leonard when he was eighteen, shortly after his grandmother's death. To his friends and many others he was simply known as "Lenny".

His father was the owner of The Samuel Bernstein Hair and Beauty Supply Company. It held the New England franchise for the Frederick's Permanent Wave Machine, whose immense popularity helped Sam get his family through the Great Depression.

In Leonard's early youth, his only exposure to music was the household radio and music on Friday nights at Congregation Mishkan Tefila in Roxbury, Massachusetts. When Leonard was ten years old, Samuel's sister Clara deposited her upright piano at her brother's house. Bernstein began teaching himself piano and music theory and was soon clamoring for lessons. He had a variety of piano teachers in his youth, including Helen Coates, who later became his secretary. In the summers, the Bernstein family would go to their vacation home in Sharon, Massachusetts, where young Leonard conscripted all the neighborhood children to put on shows ranging from Bizet's Carmen to Gilbert and Sullivan's The Pirates of Penzance. He would often play entire operas or Beethoven symphonies with his younger sister Shirley. Leonard's youngest sibling, Burton, was born in 1932, thirteen years after Leonard. Despite the large span in age, the three siblings remained close their entire lives.

Sam was initially opposed to young Leonard's interest in music and attempted to discourage his son's interest by refusing to pay for his piano lessons. Leonard then took to giving lessons to young people in his neighborhood. One of his students, Sid Ramin, became Bernstein's most frequent orchestrator and lifelong beloved friend.

Sam took his son to orchestral concerts in his teenage years and eventually supported his music education. In May 1932, Leonard attended his first orchestral concert with the Boston Pops Orchestra conducted by Arthur Fiedler. Bernstein recalled, "To me, in those days, the Pops was heaven itself ... I thought ... it was the supreme achievement of the human race." It was at this concert that Bernstein first heard Ravel's Boléro, which made a tremendous impression on him.

Another strong musical influence was George Gershwin. Bernstein was a counselor at a summer camp when news came over the radio of Gershwin's death. In the mess hall, a shaken Bernstein demanded a moment of silence, and then played Gershwin's second Prelude as a memorial.

On March 30, 1932, Bernstein played Brahms's Rhapsody in G minor at his first public piano performance in Susan Williams's studio recital at the New England Conservatory. Two years later, he made his solo debut with orchestra in Grieg's Piano Concerto in A minor with the Boston Public School Orchestra.

1935–1940: College years 
Bernstein's first two education environments were both public schools: the William Lloyd Garrison School, followed by the prestigious Boston Latin School, for which Bernstein and classmate Lawrence F. Ebb wrote the Class Song.

Harvard University 

In 1935, Bernstein enrolled at Harvard College, where he studied music with, among others, Edward Burlingame Hill and Walter Piston. His first extant composition, Psalm 148 set for voice and piano, is dated in 1935. He majored in music with a final year thesis titled "The Absorption of Race Elements into American Music" (1939; reproduced in his book Findings). One of Bernstein's intellectual influences at Harvard was the aesthetics Professor David Prall, whose multidisciplinary outlook on the arts inspired Bernstein for the rest of his life.

One of his friends at Harvard was future philosopher Donald Davidson, with whom Bernstein played piano duets. Bernstein wrote and conducted the musical score for the production Davidson mounted of Aristophanes' play The Birds, performed in the original Greek. Bernstein recycled some of this music in future works.

While a student, he was briefly an accompanist for the Harvard Glee Club as well as an unpaid pianist for Harvard Film Society's silent film presentations.

Bernstein mounted a student production of The Cradle Will Rock, directing its action from the piano as the composer Marc Blitzstein had done at the infamous premiere. Blitzstein, who attended the performance, subsequently became a close friend and mentor to Bernstein.

As a sophomore at Harvard, Bernstein met the conductor Dimitri Mitropoulos. Mitropoulos's charisma and power as a musician were major influences on Bernstein's eventual decision to become a conductor. Mitropoulos invited Bernstein to come to Minneapolis for the 1940–41 season to be his assistant, but the plan fell through due to union issues.

In 1937, Bernstein sat next to Aaron Copland at a dance recital at Town Hall in New York City. Copland invited Bernstein to his birthday party afterwards, where Bernstein impressed the guests by playing Copland's challenging Piano Variations, a work Bernstein loved. Although he was never a formal student of Copland's, Bernstein would regularly seek his advice, often citing him as his "only real composition teacher".

Bernstein graduated from Harvard in 1939 with a Bachelor of Arts cum laude.

Curtis Institute of Music 
After graduating from Harvard, Bernstein enrolled at the Curtis Institute of Music in Philadelphia. At Curtis, Bernstein studied conducting with Fritz Reiner (who anecdotally is said to have given Bernstein the only "A" grade he ever awarded); piano with Isabelle Vengerova; orchestration with Randall Thompson; counterpoint with Richard Stöhr; and score reading with Renée Longy Miquelle.

In 1940, Bernstein attended the inaugural year of the Tanglewood Music Center (then called the Berkshire Music Center) at the Boston Symphony Orchestra's summer home. Bernstein studied conducting with the BSO's music director, Serge Koussevitzky, who became a profound lifelong inspiration to Bernstein. He became Koussevitzky's conducting assistant at Tanglewood and later dedicated his Symphony No. 2: The Age of Anxiety to his beloved mentor. One of Bernstein's classmates, both at Curtis and at Tanglewood, was Lukas Foss, who remained a lifelong friend and colleague. Bernstein returned to Tanglewood nearly every summer for the rest of his life to teach and conduct the young music students.

Life and career

1940s 

Soon after he left Curtis, Bernstein moved to New York City where he lived in various apartments in Manhattan. Bernstein supported himself by coaching singers, teaching piano, and playing the piano for dance classes in Carnegie Hall. He found work with Harms-Witmark, transcribing jazz and pop music and publishing his work under the pseudonym "Lenny Amber". (Bernstein means "amber" in German.)

Bernstein briefly shared an apartment in Greenwich Village with his friend Adolph Green. Green was then part of a satirical music troupe called The Revuers, featuring Betty Comden and Judy Holliday. With Bernstein sometimes providing piano accompaniment, The Revuers often performed at the legendary jazz club the Village Vanguard.

On April 21, 1942, Bernstein performed the premiere of his first published work, Sonata for Clarinet and Piano, with clarinetist David Glazer at the Institute of Modern Art in Boston.

New York Philharmonic conducting debut 
On November 14, 1943, having recently been appointed assistant conductor to Artur Rodziński of the New York Philharmonic, Bernstein made his major conducting debut at short notice—and without any rehearsal—after guest conductor Bruno Walter came down with the flu. The challenging program included works by Robert Schumann, Miklós Rózsa, Richard Wagner, and Richard Strauss.

The next day, The New York Times carried the story on its front page and remarked in an editorial, "It's a good American success story. The warm, friendly triumph of it filled Carnegie Hall and spread far over the air waves."

Many newspapers throughout the country carried the story, which, in combination with the concert's live national CBS Radio Network broadcast, propelled Bernstein to instant fame.

Over the next two years, Bernstein made conducting debuts with ten different orchestras in the United States and Canada, greatly broadening his repertoire and initiating a lifelong frequent practice of conducting concertos from the piano.

Symphony No. 1: Jeremiah, Fancy Free, and On the Town 
On January 28, 1944, he conducted the premiere of his Symphony No. 1: Jeremiah with the Pittsburgh Symphony Orchestra with Jennie Tourel as soloist.

In the fall of 1943, Bernstein and Jerome Robbins began work on their first collaboration, Fancy Free, a ballet about three young sailors on leave in wartime New York City. Fancy Free premiered on April 18, 1944, with the Ballet Theatre (now the American Ballet Theatre) at the old Metropolitan Opera House, with scenery by Oliver Smith and costumes by Kermit Love.

Bernstein and Robbins decided to expand the ballet into a musical and invited Comden and Green to write the book and lyrics. On the Town opened on Broadway's Adelphi Theatre on December 28, 1944. The show resonated with audiences during World War II, and it broke race barriers on Broadway: Japanese-American dancer Sono Osato in a leading role; a multiracial cast dancing as mixed race couples; and a Black concertmaster, Everett Lee, who eventually took over as music director of the show. On the Town became an MGM motion picture in 1949, starring Gene Kelly, Frank Sinatra, and Jules Munshin as the three sailors. Only part of Bernstein's score was used in the film and additional songs were provided by Roger Edens.

Rising conducting career 

From 1945 to 1947, Bernstein was the music director of the New York City Symphony, which had been founded the previous year by the conductor Leopold Stokowski. The orchestra (with support from Mayor Fiorello La Guardia) had modern programs and affordable tickets.

In 1946, he made his overseas debut with the Czech Philharmonic in Prague. He also recorded Ravel's Piano Concerto in G as soloist and conductor with the Philharmonia Orchestra. On July 4, 1946, Bernstein conducted the European premiere of Fancy Free with the Ballet Theatre at the Royal Opera House in London.

In 1946, he conducted opera professionally for the first time at Tanglewood with the American premiere of Benjamin Britten's Peter Grimes, which was commissioned by Koussevitzky. That same year, Arturo Toscanini invited Bernstein to guest conduct two concerts with the NBC Symphony Orchestra, one of which featured Bernstein as soloist in Ravel's Piano Concerto in G.

Israel Philharmonic Orchestra 
In 1947, Bernstein conducted in Tel Aviv for the first time, beginning a lifelong association with the Israel Philharmonic Orchestra, then known as the Palestine Symphony Orchestra. The next year, he conducted an open-air concert for Israeli troops at Beersheba in the middle of the desert during the Arab-Israeli war. In 1957, he conducted the inaugural concert of the Mann Auditorium in Tel Aviv. In 1967, he conducted a concert on Mount Scopus to commemorate the Reunification of Jerusalem, featuring Mahler's Symphony No. 2 and Mendelssohn's Violin Concerto with soloist Isaac Stern. The city of Tel Aviv added his name to the Habima Square (Orchestra Plaza) in the center of the city.

First television appearance 
On December 10, 1949, he made his first television appearance as conductor with the Boston Symphony Orchestra at Carnegie Hall. The concert, which included an address by Eleanor Roosevelt, celebrated the first anniversary of the United Nations General Assembly's ratification of the Universal Declaration of Human Rights, and included the premiere of Aaron Copland's "Preamble" with Sir Laurence Olivier narrating text from the UN Charter. The concert was televised by NBC Television Network.

Summer at Tanglewood 
In April 1949, Bernstein performed as piano soloist in the world premiere of his Symphony No. 2: The Age of Anxiety with Koussevitzy conducting the Boston Symphony Orchestra. Later that year, Bernstein conducted the world premiere of the Olivier Messiaen's Turangalîla-Symphonie, with the Boston Symphony Orchestra. Part of the rehearsal for the concert was recorded and released by the orchestra. When Koussevitzky died in 1951, Bernstein became head of the orchestra and conducting departments at Tanglewood.

1950s

The 1950s comprised among the most active years of Bernstein's career. He created five new works for the Broadway stage; he composed several symphonic works and an iconic film score; he was appointed music director of the New York Philharmonic with whom he toured the world, including concerts behind the Iron Curtain; he harnessed the power of television to expand his educational reach; and he married and started a family.

Compositions in the 1950s

Theatrical works

Peter Pan
In 1950, Bernstein composed incidental music for a Broadway production of J. M. Barrie's play Peter Pan. The production, which opened on Broadway on April 24, 1950, starred Jean Arthur as Peter Pan and Boris Karloff in the dual roles of George Darling and Captain Hook. The show ran for 321 performances.

Trouble in Tahiti 
In 1951, Bernstein composed Trouble in Tahiti, a one-act opera in seven scenes with an English libretto by the composer. The opera portrays the troubled marriage of a couple whose idyllic suburban post-war environment belies their inner turmoil. Ironically, Bernstein wrote most of the opera while on his honeymoon in Mexico with his wife, Felicia Montealegre.

Bernstein was a visiting music professor at Brandeis University from 1951 to 1956. In 1952, he created the Brandeis Festival of the Creative Arts, where he conducted the premiere of Trouble in Tahiti on June 12 of that year.

The NBC Opera Theatre subsequently presented the opera on television in November 1952. It opened on Broadway at the Playhouse Theatre on April 19, 1955, and ran for six weeks.

Three decades later, Bernstein wrote a second opera, A Quiet Place, which picked up the story and characters of Trouble in Tahiti in a later period.

Wonderful Town 
In 1953, Bernstein wrote the score for the musical Wonderful Town on very short notice, with a book by Joseph A. Fields and Jerome Chodorov and lyrics by Betty Comden and Adolph Green. The musical tells the story of two sisters from Ohio who move to New York City and seek success from their squalid basement apartment in Greenwich Village.

Wonderful Town opened on Broadway on February 25, 1953, at the Winter Garden Theatre, starring Rosalind Russell in the role of Ruth Sherwood, Edie Adams as Eileen Sherwood, and George Gaynes as Robert Baker. It won five Tony Awards, including Best Musical and Best Actress.

Candide 
In the three years leading up to Bernstein's appointment as music director of the New York Philharmonic, Bernstein was simultaneously working on the scores for two Broadway shows. The first of the two was the operetta-style musical Candide. Lillian Hellman originally brought Bernstein her idea of adapting Voltaire's novella. The original collaborators on the show were book writer John Latouche and lyricist Richard Wilbur.

Candide opened on Broadway on December 1, 1956, at the Martin Beck Theatre, in a production directed by Tyrone Guthrie. Anxious about the parallels Hellman had deliberately drawn between Voltaire's story and the ongoing hearings conducted by the House Un-American Activities Committee, Guthrie persuaded the collaborators to cut their most incendiary sections prior to opening night.

While the production was a box office disaster, running for only two months for a total of 73 performances, the cast album became a cult classic, which kept Bernstein's score alive. There have been several revivals, with modifications to improve the book. The elements of the music that have remained best known and performed over the decades are the Overture, which quickly became one of the most frequently performed orchestral compositions by a 20th century American composer; the coloratura aria "Glitter and Be Gay", which Barbara Cook sang in the original production; and the grand finale "Make Our Garden Grow".

West Side Story 

The other musical Bernstein was writing simultaneously with Candide was West Side Story. Bernstein collaborated with director and choreographer Jerome Robbins, book writer Arthur Laurents, and lyricist Stephen Sondheim.

The story is an updated retelling of Shakespeare's Romeo and Juliet, set in the mid-1950s in the slums of New York City's Upper West Side. The Romeo character, Tony, is affiliated with the Jets gang, who are of white Northern European descent. The Juliet character is Maria, who is connected to the Sharks gang, recently arrived immigrants from Puerto Rico.

The original Broadway production opened at the Winter Garden Theatre on September 26, 1957, and ran 732 performances. Robbins won the Tony Award for Best Choreographer, and Oliver Smith won the Tony for Best Scenic Designer.

Bernstein's score for West Side Story blends "jazz, Latin rhythms, symphonic sweep and musical-comedy conventions in groundbreaking ways for Broadway". It was orchestrated by Sid Ramin and Irwin Kostal following detailed instructions from Bernstein. The dark theme, sophisticated music, extended dance scenes, and focus on social problems marked a turning point in musical theatre.

In 1960, Bernstein prepared a suite of orchestral music from the show, titled Symphonic Dances from West Side Story, which continues to be popular with orchestras worldwide.

A 1961 United Artists film adaptation, directed by Robert Wise and Robbins and starred Natalie Wood as Maria and Richard Beymer as Tony. The film won ten Academy Awards, including Best Picture and a ground-breaking Best Supporting Actress award for Puerto Rican-born Rita Moreno playing the role of Anita.

A new film adaptation directed by Steven Spielberg opened in 2021.

Serenade, Prelude, Fugue and Riffs, and On The Waterfront 
In addition to Bernstein's compositional activity for the stage, he wrote a symphonic work, Serenade after Plato's "Symposium"; the score to the Academy Award-winning film On The Waterfront; and Prelude, Fugue and Riffs, composed for jazz big band and solo clarinet.

First American to conduct at La Scala 
In 1953, Bernstein became the first American conductor to appear at La Scala in Milan, conducting Cherubini's Medea, with Maria Callas in the title role. Callas and Bernstein reunited at La Scala to perform Bellini's La sonnambula in 1955.

Omnibus 
On November 14, 1954, Bernstein presented the first of his television lectures for the CBS Television Network arts program Omnibus. The live lecture, entitled "Beethoven's Fifth Symphony", involved Bernstein explaining the symphony's first movement with the aid of musicians from the "Symphony of the Air" (formerly NBC Symphony Orchestra). The program featured manuscripts from Beethoven's own hand, as well as a giant painting of the first page of the score covering the studio floor. Six more Omnibus lectures followed from 1955 to 1961 (later on ABC and then NBC) covering a broad range of topics: jazz, conducting, American musical comedy, modern music, J.S. Bach, and grand opera.

Music director of the New York Philharmonic 
Bernstein was appointed the music director of the New York Philharmonic in 1957, sharing the post jointly with Dimitri Mitropoulos until he took sole charge in 1958. Bernstein held the music directorship until 1969 when he was appointed "Laureate Conductor". He continued to conduct and make recordings with the orchestra for the rest of his life.

Young People's Concerts with the New York Philharmonic 
Bernstein's television teaching took a quantum leap when, as the new music director of the New York Philharmonic, he put the orchestra's traditional Saturday afternoon Young People's Concerts on the CBS Television Network. Millions of viewers of all ages and around the world enthusiastically embraced Bernstein and his engaging presentations about classical music. Bernstein often presented talented young performers on the broadcasts. Many of them became celebrated in their own right, including conductors Claudio Abbado and Seiji Ozawa; flutist Paula Robison; and pianist André Watts. From 1958 until 1972, the 53 Young People's Concerts comprised the most influential series of music education programs ever produced on television. They were highly acclaimed by critics and won numerous Emmy Awards.

Some of Bernstein's scripts, all of which he wrote himself, were released in book form and on records. A recording of Humor in Music was awarded a Grammy award for Best Documentary or Spoken Word Recording (other than comedy) in 1961. The programs were shown in many countries around the world, often with Bernstein dubbed into other languages, and the concerts were later released on home video by Kultur Video.

United States Department of State tours 
In 1958, Bernstein and Mitropoulos led the New York Philharmonic on its first tour south of the border, through 12 countries in Central and South America. The United States Department of State sponsored the tour to improve the nation's relations with its southern neighbors.

In 1959, the Department of State also sponsored Bernstein and the Philharmonic on a 50-concert tour through Europe and the Soviet Union, portions of which were filmed by the CBS Television Network. A highlight of the tour was Bernstein's performance of Shostakovich's Fifth Symphony, in the presence of the composer, who came on stage at the end to congratulate Bernstein and the musicians.

1960s

New York Philharmonic Innovations
Bernstein's innovative approach to themed programming included introducing audiences to lesser performed composers at the time such as Gustav Mahler, Carl Nielsen, Jean Sibelius, and Charles Ives (including the world premiere of his Symphony No. 2). Bernstein actively advocated for the commission and performance of works by contemporary composers, conducting over 40 world premieres by a diverse roster of composers ranging from John Cage to Alberto Ginastera to Luciano Berio. He also conducted US premieres of 19 major works from around the globe, including works by Dmitri Shostakovich, Pierre Boulez, and György Ligeti.

Bernstein championed American composers, especially with whom he had a close friendship, such as Aaron Copland, William Schuman, and David Diamond. This decade saw a significant expansion of Bernstein and the Philharmonic's collaboration with Columbia Records, together they released over 400 compositions, covering a broad swath of the classical music canon.

Bernstein welcomed the Philharmonic's additions of its first Black musician, Sanford Allen, and its second woman musician, Orin O'Brien. Bernstein also shared the Philharmonic's commitment to connecting with as many New Yorkers as possible. That vision became a reality with the launch of the Concerts in the Parks in 1965, which Bernstein conducted often.

Another milestone was the Philharmonic's first visit to Japan in 1961, when Bernstein led acclaimed Philharmonic concerts and engaged in cultural exchange. Over the years he led the Orchestra on tours to 144 cities in 38 countries.

He initiated the Philharmonic's informal Thursday Evening Preview Concerts, which included Bernstein's talks from the stage, a practice that was unheard of at the time.

In one oft-reported incident, on April 6, 1962, Bernstein appeared on stage before a performance of the Brahms Piano Concerto No. 1 in D minor to explain that the soloist, Glenn Gould, had chosen an idiosyncratic approach to the work. Bernstein explained that while he did not totally agree with it, he thought Gould's interpretation was an artistically worthy exploration. Bernstein questioned: "In a concerto, who is the boss: the soloist or the conductor?" The incident created a stir that reverberated in the press for decades.

Bernstein and Mahler 
In 1960, Bernstein and the New York Philharmonic marked the centennial of Gustav Mahler's birth with a series of performances. The composer's widow, Alma, attended some of Bernstein's rehearsals. That same year, Bernstein made his first commercial recording of a Mahler symphony (the Fourth). Over the next seven years, he recorded the entire Mahler symphony cycle with the New York Philharmonic (except for the 8th Symphony, which was recorded with the London Symphony Orchestra).

The combination of concert performances, television talks, and recordings led to a renewed interest in Mahler, especially in the United States. Bernstein claimed that he identified with the works on a personal level, and once wrote of the composer: "I'm so sympathetic to Mahler: I understand his problem. It's like being two different men locked up in the same body; one man is a conductor and the other a composer ... It's like being a double man."

Opening Lincoln Center 
On May 14, 1959, President Dwight D. Eisenhower broke ground for Lincoln Center for the Performing Arts. On September 23, 1962, the New York Philharmonic moved from Carnegie Hall to its new home, Philharmonic Hall (now David Geffen Hall). Bernstein conducted the gala opening concert featuring works by Mahler, Beethoven, and Vaughan Williams, as well as the premiere of Aaron Copland's Connotations.

Metropolitan Opera debut 
In 1964, Bernstein conducted at The Metropolitan Opera for the first time in Franco Zeffirelli's production of Verdi's Falstaff. In subsequent years, Bernstein returned to The Met to conduct Cavalleria Rusticana (1970) and Carmen (1972), as well as at the Centennial Gala in 1983.

An Artist's Response to Violence 
In 1961, Bernstein composed a fanfare for President John F. Kennedy's pre-inaugural gala, at which Bernstein conducted.

On November 23, 1963, the day after the assassination of President John F. Kennedy, Bernstein conducted the New York Philharmonic and the Schola Cantorum of New York in a nationally televised memorial featuring the Mahler's Symphony No. 2: "Resurrection". Later that week, in a speech to the United Jewish Appeal, Bernstein said: "This will be our reply to violence: to make music more intensely, more beautifully, more devotedly than ever before."

After President Kennedy's brother Robert F. Kennedy was assassinated in 1968, Bernstein conducted at the funeral mass, featuring the "Adagietto" movement from Mahler's Symphony No. 5.

Kaddish and Chichester Psalms 
Due to his commitment to the New York Philharmonic and his many other activities, Bernstein had little time for composition during the 1960s. Nevertheless, he was able to compose two major works.

Bernstein's Symphony No. 3: Kaddish was written in 1963; Bernstein dedicated the work: "To the Beloved Memory of John F. Kennedy." The work features a large orchestra, a full choir, a boys' choir, a soprano soloist, and a narrator. "Kaddish" refers to the Jewish prayer recited for the dead. Bernstein wrote the text of the narration himself; his wife, Felicia Montealegre, narrated the US premiere of the work.

In 1965, Bernstein took a sabbatical year from the New York Philharmonic in order to concentrate on composition, during which he composed Chichester Psalms. Commissioned by the Dean of Chichester Cathedral, Walter Hussey, the work premiered at Philharmonic Hall in New York City on July 15, 1965, conducted by Bernstein himself, and subsequently at Chichester Cathedral, conducted by John Birch. For his text, Bernstein chose excerpts from the Book of Psalms in the original Hebrew. In 2018, Bernstein's Centennial year, Chichester Psalms was cited as the 5th-most performed concert work worldwide.

Vienna Philharmonic debut 
In 1966, Bernstein began a lifelong rich relationship with the Vienna Philharmonic, conducting concerts as well as making his debut at the Vienna State Opera in Luchino Visconti's production of Falstaff with Dietrich Fischer-Dieskau in the title role. Bernstein was largely responsible for restoring the works of Mahler to the Vienna Philharmonic's core repertoire. Bernstein recorded Mahler's Symphonies numerous times with the orchestra.

He returned to the State Opera in 1968 for a production of Der Rosenkavalier and in 1970 for Otto Schenk's production of Beethoven's Fidelio.

1970s

During the 1970s, Bernstein's company, Amberson, in partnership with Unitel, produced and coordinated filmed recordings of his symphonic concerts around the world. For the remainder of his life, Bernstein preferred to derive his audio recordings from live performances. Nearly 80% of Bernstein's recordings with his new recording partner, Deutsche Grammophon, were recorded live.

Bernstein's major compositions during the 1970s were his Mass: A Theatre Piece for Singers, Players, and Dancers; his score for the ballet Dybbuk; his orchestral vocal work Songfest; and his U.S. bicentennial musical 1600 Pennsylvania Avenue, with lyrics by Alan Jay Lerner, which was his last Broadway show and his only theatrical flop.

Mass: A Theatre Piece for Singers, Players, and Dancers 
In 1966, Jacqueline Kennedy commissioned Bernstein to compose a work for the inauguration of the John F. Kennedy Center for the Performing Arts in Washington, D.C. Bernstein began writing Mass in 1969 as a large-scale theatrical work based on the Tridentine Mass of the Catholic Church, and in 1971, Bernstein invited the young composer and lyricist Stephen Schwartz, who had recently opened the musical Godspell off-Broadway, to collaborate as co-lyricist. The world premiere took place on September 8, 1971, conducted by Maurice Peress, directed by Gordon Davidson, and choreographed by Alvin Ailey.

Bernstein's score combines elements of musical theater, jazz, gospel, blues, folk, rock, and symphonic music, and the libretto combines Latin and English liturgy, Hebrew prayer, and additional lyrics written by Bernstein and Schwartz.

Mass received both rapturous and critical reactions, from audiences and music critics alike. While some members of the Catholic Church praised the piece's expression of contemporary crises of faith, others considered it blasphemous. (In 2000, Pope John Paul II requested a performance of Mass at the Vatican itself.) President Richard Nixon declined to attend the premiere due to its anti-Vietnam War message. Viewpoints on Mass continue to evolve over time, and Edward Seckerson wrote in 2021, 50 years after its premiere: "Put simply, no other work of Bernstein's encapsulates exactly who he was as a man or as a musician; no other work displays his genius, his intellect, his musical virtuosity and innate theatricality quite like MASS."

The Unanswered Question: Six Talks at Harvard 
In the 1972–73 academic year, Bernstein was appointed to the Charles Eliot Norton Chair as Professor of Poetry at Harvard, where he delivered six lectures, The Unanswered Question, which explored such elements as tonality, harmony, and form through the lens of Noam Chomsky's linguistic theories. Bernstein provided musical examples from the piano, and pre-recorded musical works with the Boston Symphony Orchestra. Amberson arranged for the lectures to be videotaped at the WGBH studios in Boston. The six lectures were broadcast on PBS in 1976, and subsequently released on home video and published as a book.

Dybbuk 
Bernstein collaborated with Jerome Robbins to create Dybbuk, a ballet based on S. Ansky's play of the same name. The ballet depicts Ansky's tale of a young woman possessed by a malicious spirit, known in Jewish folklore as a "dybbuk". Dybbuk was premiered by the New York City Ballet at the New York State Theater on 16 May 1974, with Bernstein conducting. A revision of the choreography and the score was made later the same year, titled Dybbuk Variations. It received its premiere in November 1974.

Songfest: A Cycle of American Poems for Six Singers and Orchestra 
Bernstein's Songfest: A Cycle of American Poems for Six Singers and Orchestra premiered on October 11, 1977, the Kennedy Center in Washington, D.C, with the composer conducting the National Symphony Orchestra. The work was intended as a tribute to the 1976 American Bicentennial but was not finished in time.

The work sets an array of texts by thirteen American poets spanning three centuries. Bernstein deliberately selected the widest possible array of literary voices to express the nation's essential diversity; the poets include June Jordan, Julia de Burgos, Walt Whitman, and Langston Hughes.

On July 4, 1985, Bernstein conducted a nationally televised performance of Songfest as part of the National Symphony's annual A Capitol Fourth concert.

International conducting and recordings 
After becoming Conductor Laureate of the New York Philharmonic in 1969, Bernstein took advantage of his freed-up schedule to increase the pace of his world travel, conducting twenty-nine orchestras throughout Europe, Asia, and the Americas, and making live recordings with them for both Unitel GmbH & Co.KG and Deutsche Grammophon.

Bernstein founded Amberson Productions in 1969. In partnership with Unitel, Amberson created many video productions of concert performances, starting with Verdi's Requiem Mass in St. Paul's Cathedral with the London Symphony Orchestra in 1970, produced and directed by Humphrey Burton. Burton would go on to collaborate with Bernstein on his music video projects for the rest of Bernstein's life.

In 1972, Bernstein recorded Bizet's Carmen, with Marilyn Horne in the title role and James McCracken as Don Jose, after leading several stage performances of the opera at The Metropolitan Opera. The recording was one of the first in stereo to use the original spoken dialogue between the sung portions of the opera. The recording was Bernstein's first for Deutsche Grammophon and won a Grammy.

In working with Unitel and Deutsche Grammophon, Bernstein made a host of video and audio recordings with such orchestras as Royal Concertgebouw Orchestra, Orchestre de Paris, Boston Symphony Orchestra, Orchestra Sinfonica di Roma della Rai, Israel Philharmonic Orchestra, and Orchestre National de France. In the late 1970s, Bernstein conducted a complete Beethoven symphony cycle with the Vienna Philharmonic, and cycles of Brahms and Schumann were to follow in the 1980s.

Among the many noteworthy Amberson productions with Unitel were Bernstein conducting Mahler's Symphony No. 2 "Resurrection" with the London Symphony Orchestra at Ely Cathedral in 1973 and Fidelio at the Vienna State Opera in 1978. In 1970, Bernstein wrote and narrated "Bernstein on Beethoven: A Celebration in Vienna," an in-depth exploration of Beethoven on the composer's 200th birthday, filmed on location in and around Vienna. It features excerpts of Bernstein's rehearsals and performance of Fidelio at the Vienna State Opera, directed by Otto Schenk (which was later revived and filmed in 1978); Bernstein playing the Piano Concerto No. 1 and conducting from the piano; and a performance of Symphony No. 9 with the Vienna Philharmonic, featuring the young Plácido Domingo among the soloists. The show, produced and directed by Humphrey Burton, was broadcast around the world and won an Emmy Award.

Also recorded by Unitel, in October 1976, was Bernstein's concert in Munich with the Bavarian Radio Symphony Orchestra and pianist Claudio Arrau to benefit Amnesty International. To honor his late wife and to continue their joint support for human rights, Bernstein subsequently established the Felicia Montealegre Bernstein Fund of Amnesty International USA to provide aid for human rights activists.

In 1979, Bernstein conducted the Berlin Philharmonic for the first and only time, in two charity concerts for Amnesty International featuring performances of Mahler's Ninth Symphony, recorded live on Deutsche Grammophon. The invitation for the concerts had come from the orchestra and not from its principal conductor Herbert von Karajan. There has been speculation about why Karajan never invited Bernstein to conduct his orchestra. The full reasons will probably never be known—they were on friendly terms, but sometimes practiced a little mutual one-upmanship.

1980s

In the 1980s Bernstein pursued a packed schedule, continuing to conduct, teach, compose, and produce several television documentaries. His most significant compositions of the decade were his opera A Quiet Place; Divertimento for Orchestra; Ḥalil for flute and orchestra; Concerto for Orchestra "Jubilee Games"; and the song cycle Arias and Barcarolles. Bernstein received the Kennedy Center Honors award in 1980, a Grammy Lifetime Achievement Award in 1985, France's Legion of Honor (Commandeur) in 1985, and Japan's Praemium Imperiale in 1990, among others. In the 1980s, Bernstein cemented his educational legacy by co-founding three music academies: Los Angeles Philharmonic Institute, Schleswig-Holstein Musik Festival Orchestral Academy, and the Pacific Music Festival.

A Quiet Place 
In 1983, Bernstein wrote a new opera, A Quiet Place, with a libretto by Stephen Wadsworth. The opera premiered at the Houston Grand Opera on June 17, 1983, conducted by John DeMain. The opera was a sequel to Bernstein's 1951 opera Trouble in Tahiti, which preceded the new opera at the premiere. In 1984, Bernstein and Wadsworth reconfigured A Quiet Place to include Trouble in Tahiti in its middle. This version was performed at La Scala and the Kennedy Center, with John Mauceri conducting. In 1986, Bernstein himself conducted and recorded the work at the Vienna State Opera.

International fame 

In 1982 in the U.S., PBS aired an 11-part series of Bernstein's late 1970s films for Unitel of the Vienna Philharmonic playing all nine Beethoven symphonies and various other Beethoven works. Bernstein gave spoken introduction and actor Maximilian Schell was also featured on the programs, reading from Beethoven's letters. The original films have since been released on DVD by Deutsche Grammophon. In addition to conducting in New York, Vienna and Israel, Bernstein was a regular guest conductor of other orchestras in the 1980s. These included the Royal Concertgebouw Orchestra in Amsterdam, with whom he recorded Mahler's First, Fourth, and Ninth Symphonies amongst other works; the Bavarian Radio Symphony Orchestra in Munich, with whom he recorded Wagner's Tristan und Isolde; Haydn's Creation; Mozart's Requiem and Great Mass in C minor; and the orchestra of Accademia Nazionale di Santa Cecilia in Rome, with whom he recorded some Debussy and Puccini's La bohème.

In 1984, he conducted a recording of West Side Story, the first time he had conducted the entire work. The recording, featuring what some critics felt were miscast opera singers such as Kiri Te Kanawa, José Carreras, and Tatiana Troyanos in the leading roles, was nevertheless an international bestseller. A TV documentary The Making of West Side Story about the recording was made at the same time and has been released as a DVD. Bernstein also continued to make his own TV documentaries during the 1980s, including The Little Drummer Boy, in which he discussed the music of Gustav Mahler, perhaps the composer he was most passionately interested in, and The Love of Three Orchestras, in which he discussed his work in New York, Vienna, and Israel.

In his later years, Bernstein's life and work were celebrated around the world (as they have been since his death). The Israel Philharmonic celebrated his involvement with them at festivals in Israel and Austria in 1977. In 1986 the London Symphony Orchestra mounted a Bernstein Festival in London with one concert that Bernstein himself conducted attended by the Queen. In 1988, Bernstein's 70th birthday was celebrated by a lavish televised gala at Tanglewood featuring many performers who had worked with him over the years.

During summer 1987, he celebrated the 100th anniversary of Nadia Boulanger at the American Conservatory in Fontainebleau. He gave a masterclass inside the castle of Fontainebleau.

In December 1989, Bernstein conducted live performances and recorded in the studio his operetta Candide with the London Symphony Orchestra. The recording starred Jerry Hadley, June Anderson, Adolph Green, and Christa Ludwig in the leading roles. The use of opera singers in some roles perhaps fitted the style of operetta better than some critics had thought was the case for West Side Story, and the posthumously released recording was universally praised. One of the live concerts from the Barbican Centre in London is available on DVD. Candide had had a troubled history, with many rewrites and writers involved. Bernstein's concert and recording were based on a final version that had been first performed by Scottish Opera in 1988. The opening night, which Bernstein attended in Glasgow, was conducted by his former student John Mauceri.

Educational Initiatives 
Bernstein's nurturing experience at the Tanglewood Music Festival inspired him to use his international influence to recreate that environment for young musicians in the final years of his life.

Los Angeles Philharmonic Institute 
In 1982, Bernstein, with Los Angeles Philharmonic General Manager Ernest Fleischmann and University of Southern California professor Daniel Lewis, co-founded the Los Angeles Philharmonic Institute, a summer training academy inspired by Tanglewood. Bernstein served as artistic co-director and taught conducting classes for two summers. During that time, he performed and recorded American works, including some of his own, with the Los Angeles Philharmonic for Deutsche Grammophon.

Orchestra Academy of the Schleswig-Holstein Music Festival 
In May 1986, Bernstein conducted the Bavarian Radio Symphony Orchestra and Chorus for the inaugural concert of the Schleswig-Holstein Music Festival, in a performance of Haydn’s Die Schöpfung ("The Creation"). He returned the following year when he founded the Festival’s Orchestra Academy, once again recreating the nurturing atmosphere of Bernstein's Tanglewood experience. Over three summers, Bernstein took the students on international tours to Germany, Italy, and the Soviet Union.

To commemorate Bernstein’s legacy as an educator and founder of the Orchestra Academy, the Festival created the Leonard Bernstein Award in 2002, which has honored young musicians including Lang Lang, Jonathan Biss, and Alisa Weilerstein, among many others.

Founding of Pacific Music Festival 
In 1990, Bernstein's final summer, he founded the Pacific Music Festival in Sapporo, Japan with Michael Tilson Thomas and the London Symphony Orchestra. The Festival's goal was to emphasize musical training for young students in the Pacific region.

In his opening address, Bernstein said: "And my decision has been, without too much thought, to spend most of the remaining energy and time the Lord grants me in education and sharing, as much as possible, with younger people." As Artistic Director, Bernstein worked with the students in that first summer, but had to cut his time short due to ill health.

Bernstein Education Through the Arts (BETA) Fund 
In 1990, Bernstein received the Praemium Imperiale, an international prize awarded by the Japan Arts Association for lifetime achievement in the arts. Bernstein used the $100,000 prize to establish The Bernstein Education Through the Arts (BETA) Fund. He provided this grant to develop an arts-based education program. The Leonard Bernstein Center was posthumously established in April 1992, and initiated extensive school-based research, ultimately leading to the current Leonard Bernstein Artful Learning Program.

Ode to "Freedom" 
On December 25, 1989, Bernstein conducted Beethoven's Symphony No. 9 in East Berlin's Schauspielhaus as part of a celebration of the fall of the Berlin Wall. He had conducted the same work in West Berlin the previous day. The concert was broadcast live in more than twenty countries to an estimated audience of 100 million people. For the occasion, Bernstein reworded Friedrich Schiller's text of the Ode to Joy, using the word Freiheit (freedom) instead of the original Freude (joy). Bernstein, in his spoken introduction, said that they had "taken the liberty" of doing this because of a "most likely phony" story, apparently believed in some quarters, that Schiller wrote an "Ode to Freedom" that is now presumed lost. Bernstein added, "I'm sure that Beethoven would have given us his blessing."

Bernstein was also at the time a committed supporter of nuclear disarmament. In 1985 he took the European Community Youth Orchestra in a "Journey for Peace" tour across Europe and Japan, including at the Hiroshima Peace Ceremony to commemorate the 40th anniversary of the bombing.

Final concert at Tanglewood 
Bernstein conducted his last concert on August 19, 1990, with the Boston Symphony Orchestra at Tanglewood. The program consisted of Benjamin Britten's Four Sea Interludes from Peter Grimes and Beethoven's Symphony No. 7. He suffered a coughing fit during the third movement of the Beethoven symphony, but continued to conduct the piece until its conclusion, leaving the stage during the ovation, appearing exhausted and in pain. The concert was later issued in edited form on CD as Leonard Bernstein – The Final Concert by Deutsche Grammophon. Also included was Bernstein's own Arias and Barcarolles in an orchestration by Bright Sheng. However, poor health prevented Bernstein from performing it. Carl St. Clair was engaged to conduct it in his stead.

Personal life
After much personal struggle and a turbulent on-off engagement, Bernstein married actress Felicia Cohn Montealegre on September 10, 1951. One suggestion is that he chose to marry partly to dispel rumors about his private life to help secure a major conducting appointment, following advice from his mentor Dimitri Mitropoulos about the conservative nature of orchestra boards. Bernstein had expressed the same internal conflict and sought similar advice from Aaron Copland in April 1943, suggesting he could resolve it by marrying his then "girl-friend ... my dentist's daughter". (Adolph Green asked Bernstein about the status of this idea in a letter five months later.) In a private letter published after both had died, Bernstein's wife within a year of their marriage acknowledged his homosexuality. Felicia wrote to him: "You are a homosexual and may never change—you don't admit to the possibility of a double life, but if your peace of mind, your health, your whole nervous system depend on a certain sexual pattern what can you do?" Arthur Laurents (Bernstein's collaborator in West Side Story) said that Bernstein was "a gay man who got married. He wasn't conflicted about it at all. He was just gay." Shirley Rhoades Perle, another friend of Bernstein, said that she thought "he required men sexually and women emotionally". But the early years of his marriage seem to have been happy, and no one has suggested Bernstein and his wife did not love each other. They had three children, Jamie, Alexander, and Nina. There are reports, though, that Bernstein did sometimes have brief liaisons with young men, which his wife and children knew about.

A major period of upheaval in Bernstein's personal life began in 1976 when he decided that he could no longer conceal his homosexuality. He left Felicia for a period to live with the musical director of the classical music radio station KKHI in San Francisco, Tom Cothran. The next year Felicia was diagnosed with lung cancer, and eventually Bernstein moved back in with her and cared for her until she died on June 16, 1978. Bernstein is reported to have often spoken of feeling terrible guilt over his wife's death. Most biographies of Bernstein state that his lifestyle became more excessive and his personal behavior sometimes more reckless and crude after Felicia's death. However, his public standing and many of his close friendships appear to have remained unaffected, and he resumed his busy schedule of musical activity.

His affairs with men included a ten-year relationship with Kunihiko Hashimoto, a Tokyo insurance employee. The two met when the New York Philharmonic was performing in Tokyo. Hashimoto went backstage and they ended up spending the night together. It was a long distance affair, but according to letters, they both cared about each other deeply. Dearest Lenny: Letters from Japan and the Making of the World Maestro by Mari Yoshihara (Oxford University Press, 2019) goes into detail about their letters and relationship including interviews with Hashimoto. The book also includes other letters Bernstein received from Japanese fans.

Bernstein had asthma, which kept him from serving in the military during World War II.

Death and legacy

Bernstein announced his retirement from conducting on October 9, 1990. He died five days later, in his New York apartment at The Dakota, of a heart attack brought on by mesothelioma. He was 72 years old. A longtime heavy smoker, he had emphysema from his mid-50s. On the day of his funeral procession through the streets of Manhattan, construction workers removed their hats and waved, calling out "Goodbye, Lenny". Bernstein is buried in Green-Wood Cemetery, Brooklyn, New York, next to his wife and with a copy of Mahler's Fifth Symphony opened to the famous Adagietto lying across his heart. On August 25, 2018 (his 100th birthday), he was honored with a Google Doodle. Also for his centennial, the Skirball Cultural Center in Los Angeles created an exhibition titled Leonard Bernstein at 100.

Social activism
While Bernstein was very well known for his music compositions and conducting, he was also known for his outspoken political views and his strong desire to further social change. His first aspirations for social change were made apparent in his producing (as a student) a recently banned opera, The Cradle Will Rock, by Marc Blitzstein, about the disparity between the working and upper class. His first opera, Trouble in Tahiti, was dedicated to Blitzstein and has a strong social theme, criticizing American civilization and suburban upper-class life in particular. As he went on in his career, Bernstein would go on to fight for everything from the influences of "American Music" to the disarming of western nuclear weapons.

Like many of his friends and colleagues, Bernstein had been involved in various left-wing causes and organizations since the 1940s. He was blacklisted by the US State Department and CBS in the early 1950s, but unlike others his career was not greatly affected, and he was never required to testify before the House Un-American Activities Committee.

His political life received substantial press coverage though in 1970, due to a gathering hosted at his Manhattan apartment at 895 Park Avenue on January 14, 1970. Bernstein and his wife held the event seeking to raise awareness and money for the defense of several members of the Black Panther Party against a variety of charges, especially the case of the Panther 21. The New York Times initially covered the gathering as a lifestyle item, but later posted an editorial harshly unfavorable to Bernstein following generally negative reaction to the widely publicized story.

This reaction culminated in June 1970 with the appearance of "Radical Chic: That Party at Lenny's", an essay by journalist Tom Wolfe featured on the cover of the magazine New York. The article contrasted the Bernsteins' comfortable lifestyle in one of the world's most expensive neighborhoods with the anti-establishment politics of the Black Panthers. It led to the popularization of "radical chic" as a critical term. Both Bernstein and his wife Felicia responded to the criticism, arguing that they were motivated not by a shallow desire to express fashionable sympathy but by their concern for civil liberties.

Bernstein was named in the book Red Channels: The Report of Communist Influence in Radio and Television (1950) as a Communist along with Aaron Copland, Lena Horne, Pete Seeger, Artie Shaw and other prominent figures of the performing arts. Red Channels was issued by the right-wing journal Counterattack.

Rostropovich 
Bernstein played an instrumental role in the release of renowned cellist and conductor Mstislav Rostropovich from the USSR in 1974. Rostropovich, a strong believer in free speech and democracy, had been officially held in disgrace; his concerts and tours both at home and abroad cancelled, and in 1972 he was prohibited to travel outside of the Soviet Union. During a trip to the USSR in 1974, Massachusetts Senator Ted Kennedy and his wife Joan, urged by Bernstein and others in the cultural sphere, mentioned Rostropovich's situation to Leonid Brezhnev, the Soviet Union Communist Party Leader. Two days later, Rostropovich was granted his exit visa.

Philanthropy
Among the many awards Bernstein earned throughout his life, one allowed him to make one of his philanthropic dreams a reality. He had for a long time wanted to develop an international school to help promote the integration of arts into education. When he won the Praemium Imperiale, Japan Arts Association award for lifetime achievement in 1990, he used the $100,000 that came with the award to build such a school in Nashville, that would strive to teach teachers how to better integrate music, dance, and theater into the school system which was "not working". The school opened shortly after Bernstein's death. This would eventually yield an initiative known as Artful Learning as part of the Leonard Bernstein Center.

Influence and characteristics as a conductor

Bernstein was one of the major figures in orchestral conducting in the second half of the 20th century. He was held in high regard amongst many musicians, including the members of the Vienna Philharmonic, evidenced by his honorary membership; the London Symphony Orchestra, of which he was president; and the Israel Philharmonic Orchestra, with which he appeared regularly as guest conductor. He was probably the main conductor from the 1960s onwards who acquired a sort of superstar status similar to that of Herbert von Karajan, although unlike Karajan he conducted relatively little opera and part of Bernstein's fame was based on his role as a composer. As the first American-born music director of the New York Philharmonic, his rise to prominence was a factor in overcoming the perception of the time that the top conductors were necessarily trained in Europe.

Bernstein's conducting was characterized by extremes of emotion with the rhythmic pulse of the music conveyed visually through his balletic podium manner. Musicians often reported that his manner in rehearsal was the same as in concert. As he got older his performances tended to be overlaid to a greater extent with a personal expressiveness which often divided critical opinion. Extreme examples of this style can be found in his Deutsche Grammophon recordings of "Nimrod" from Elgar's Enigma Variations (1982), the end of Mahler's 9th Symphony (1985), and the finale of Tchaikovsky's Pathétique Symphony (1986), where in each case the tempos are well below those typically chosen. A skilled pianist, he used to perform the piano parts himself and conduct orchestras from the keyboard (for instance, when he conducted Gershwin's Rhapsody in Blue).

Bernstein performed a wide repertoire from the Baroque era to the 20th century, although perhaps from the 1970s onwards he tended to focus more on music from the Romantic era. He was considered especially accomplished with the works of Gustav Mahler and with American composers in general, including George Gershwin, Aaron Copland, Charles Ives, Roy Harris, William Schuman, and of course himself. Some of his recordings of works by these composers would likely appear on many music critics' lists of recommended recordings. A list of his other well-thought-of recordings would include, among others, individual works from Haydn, Beethoven, Berlioz, Schumann, Liszt, Nielsen, Sibelius, Stravinsky, Hindemith, and Shostakovich. His recordings of Rhapsody in Blue (full-orchestra version) and An American in Paris for Columbia Records, released in 1959, are considered definitive by many, although Bernstein cut the Rhapsody slightly, and his more 'symphonic' approach with slower tempi is quite far from Gershwin's own conception of the piece, evident from his two recordings. (Oscar Levant, Earl Wild, and others come closer to Gershwin's own style.) Bernstein never conducted Gershwin's Piano Concerto in F, or more than a few excerpts from Porgy and Bess, although he did discuss the latter in his article Why Don't You Run Upstairs and Write a Nice Gershwin Tune?, originally published in The New York Times and later reprinted in his 1959 book The Joy of Music.

In addition to being an active conductor, Bernstein was an influential teacher of conducting. During his many years of teaching at Tanglewood and elsewhere, he directly taught or mentored many younger conductors, including John Mauceri, Marin Alsop, Herbert Blomstedt, Edo de Waart, Alexander Frey, Paavo Järvi, Eiji Oue, Maurice Peress, Seiji Ozawa (who made his American TV debut as the guest conductor on one of the Young People's Concerts), Carl St. Clair, Helmuth Rilling, Michael Tilson Thomas, and Jaap van Zweden. He also undoubtedly influenced the career choices of many American musicians who grew up watching his television programmes in the 1950s and 60s.

Recordings

{{external media|align=center|width=130px|audio1= Leonard Bernstein conducts the Columbia Symphony Orchestra with Glenn Gould in:  Beethoven's Piano Concerto No.2 in B Flat Major, Op. 19  Bach's Keyboard Concerto No. 1 in D Minor, BWV 1052 in 1957 [https://archive.org/details/beethoven-concerto-no.-2-in-b-flat-major-for-piano-and-orchestra-op-19-bach-conc 'Here on archive.org] }}
Bernstein recorded extensively from the mid-1940s until just a few months before his death. Aside from those 1940s recordings, which were made for RCA Victor, Bernstein recorded primarily for Columbia Masterworks Records, especially when he was music director of the New York Philharmonic between 1958 and 1971. In the late 1950's he also joined forces with the Columbia Symphony Orchestra and Glenn Gould in a recording of Beethoven's Piano Concerto No. 2 in B flat major, Op. 19 and Bach's Keyboard Concerto No. 1 in D minor, BWV 1052 for Columbia Masterworks (ML 5211, 1957). His typical pattern of recording at that time was to record major works in the studio immediately after they were presented in the orchestra's subscription concerts or on one of the Young People's Concerts, with any spare time used to record short orchestral showpieces and similar works. Many of these performances were digitally remastered and reissued by Sony Classical Records (the successor to American Columbia/CBS Masterworks following Sony's 1990 acquisition of Columbia/CBS Records) between 1992 and 1993 as part of its 100 volume, 125-CD "Royal Edition", as well as its 1997–2001 "Bernstein Century" series. The rights to Bernstein's 1940s RCA Victor recordings became fully owned by Sony following its 2008 acquisition of Bertelsmann Music Group's (BMG), and now controls both the RCA Victor and Columbia archives. The complete Bernstein Columbia and RCA Victor catalog was reissued on CD in a three-volume series of box sets (released in 2010, 2014, and 2018, respectively) comprising a total of 198 discs under the mantle "Leonard Bernstein Edition".

His later recordings (starting with Bizet's Carmen in 1972) were mostly made for Deutsche Grammophon, though he would occasionally return to the Columbia label. Notable exceptions include recordings of Gustav Mahler's Song of the Earth and Mozart's 15th piano concerto and "Linz" symphony with the Vienna Philharmonic for Decca Records (1966); Berlioz's Symphonie fantastique and Harold in Italy (1976) for EMI; and Wagner's Tristan und Isolde (1981) for Philips Records, a label that like Deutsche Grammophon was part of PolyGram at that time. Unlike his studio recordings for Columbia Masterworks, most of his later Deutsche Grammophon recordings were taken from live concerts (or edited together from several concerts with additional sessions to correct errors). Many replicate repertoire that he recorded in the 1950s and 60s.

In addition to his audio recordings, many of Bernstein's concerts from the 1970s onwards were recorded on motion picture film by the German film company Unitel. This included a complete cycle of the Mahler symphonies (with the Vienna Philharmonic and London Symphony Orchestra), as well as complete cycles of the Beethoven, Brahms and Schumann symphonies recorded at the same series of concerts as the audio recordings by Deutsche Grammophon. Many of these films appeared on LaserDisc and are now on DVD.

In total Bernstein was awarded 16 Grammys for his recordings in various categories, including several for posthumously released recordings. He was also awarded a Lifetime Achievement Grammy in 1985.

Influence and characteristics as a composer

Bernstein was an eclectic composer whose music fused elements of jazz, Jewish music, theatre music, and the work of earlier composers like Aaron Copland, Igor Stravinsky, Darius Milhaud, George Gershwin, and Marc Blitzstein. Some of his works, especially his score for West Side Story, helped bridge the gap between classical and popular music. His music was rooted in tonality but in some works like his Kaddish Symphony and the opera A Quiet Place he mixed in 12-tone elements. Bernstein himself said his main motivation for composing was "to communicate" and that all his pieces, including his symphonies and concert works, "could in some sense be thought of as 'theatre' pieces".

According to the League of American Orchestras, he was the second most frequently performed American composer by U.S. orchestras in 2008–09 behind Copland, and he was the 16th most frequently performed composer overall by U.S. orchestras. (Some performances were probably due to the 2008 90th anniversary of his birth.) His most popular pieces were the Overture to Candide, the Symphonic Dances from West Side Story, the Serenade after Plato's "Symposium" and the Three Dance Episodes from On the Town. His shows West Side Story, On the Town, Wonderful Town and Candide are regularly performed, and his symphonies and concert works are programmed from time to time by orchestras around the world. Since his death many of his works have been commercially recorded by artists other than himself. The Serenade, which has been recorded more than 10 times, is probably his most recorded work not taken from an actual theatre piece.

Despite the fact that he was a popular success as a composer, Bernstein himself is reported to have been disillusioned that some of his more serious works were not rated more highly by critics, and that he himself had not been able to devote more time to composing because of his conducting and other activities. Professional criticism of Bernstein's music often involves discussing the degree to which he created something new as art versus simply skillfully borrowing and fusing together elements from others. In the late 1960s, Bernstein himself reflected that his eclecticism was in part due to his lack of lengthy periods devoted to composition, and that he was still seeking to enrich his own personal musical language in the manner of the great composers of the past, all of whom had borrowed elements from others. Perhaps the harshest criticism he received from some critics in his lifetime though was directed at works like his Kaddish Symphony, his MASS and the opera A Quiet Place, where they found the underlying message of the piece or the text as either mildly embarrassing, clichéd or offensive. Despite this, all these pieces have been performed, discussed and reconsidered since his death.

The Chichester Psalms, and excerpts from his Third Symphony and MASS were performed for Pope John Paul II, including at World Youth Day 1993 in Denver on August 14, 1993, and at the Papal Concert to Commemorate the Shoah on April 7, 1994, with the Royal Philharmonic Orchestra in the Sala Nervi at the Vatican. Both performances were conducted by Gilbert Levine.

Bibliography

 
 

Videography
 The Unanswered Question: Six Talks at Harvard. West Long Branch, New Jersey: Kultur Video. VHS . DVD . (videotape of the Charles Eliot Norton Lectures given at Harvard in 1973.)Leonard Bernstein's Young People's Concerts with the New York Philharmonic. West Long Branch, New Jersey: Kultur Video. DVD .Bernstein on Beethoven: A Celebration in Vienna/Beethoven: Piano Concerto No. 1. West Long Branch, Kultur Video. DVDLeonard Bernstein: Omnibus – The Historic TV Broadcasts, 2010, E1 Ent.Bernstein: Reflections (1978), A rare personal portrait of Leonard Bernstein by Peter Rosen. Euroarts DVDBernstein/Beethoven (1982), Deutsche Grammophon, DVDThe Metropolitan Opera Centennial Gala (1983), Deutsche Grammophon, DVD 00440-073-4538Bernstein Conducts "West Side Story" (1985) (retitled The Making of West Side Story in re-releases) Deutsche Grammophon. DVD"The Rite of Spring" in RehearsalMozart's Great Mass in C minor, Exsultate, jubilate & Ave verum corpus (1990), Deutsche Grammophon. DVD 00440-073-4240"Leonard Bernstein: Reaching for the Note" (1998) Documentary on his life and music. Originally aired on PBS's American Masters series. DVD

Awards

 Fellow of the American Academy of Arts and Sciences, 1951
 Fellow at the MacDowell 1962, 1970, 1972
 Sonning Award (Denmark), 1965
 Ditson Conductor's Award, 1958
 George Peabody Medal – Johns Hopkins University, 1980
 Ernst von Siemens Music Prize, 1987
 Royal Philharmonic Society Gold Medal (UK), 1987
 Edward MacDowell Medal, 1987
 Knight Grand Cross Order of Merit (Italy), 1989
 Grammy Award for Best Album for Children
 Grammy Award for Best Orchestral Performance
 Grammy Award for Best Choral Performance
 Grammy Award for Best Opera Recording
 Grammy Award for Best Classical Vocal Performance
 Grammy Award for Best Instrumental Soloist(s) Performance
 Grammy Award for Best Classical Contemporary Composition
 Grammy Award for Best Classical Album
 Grammy Lifetime Achievement Award
 Tony Award for Best Musical
 Special Tony Award
 Japan Arts Association Lifetime Achievement Award
Gramophone Hall of Fame entrant
 Commandeur de la Légion d'honneur, 1986

Bernstein is also a member of both the American Theater Hall of Fame and the Television Hall of Fame. In 2015, he was inducted into the Legacy Walk.

 References 
Citations

Sources
 
 (Doubleday edition)
 
 
 

 
 

Further reading

 Bernstein, Burton (1982). Family Matters: Sam, Jennie, and the Kids. Simon & Schuster. .
 
 Bernstein, Jamie (2018). Famous Father Girl: A Memoir of Growing Up Bernstein. HarperCollins Publishers. .
 Bernstein, Shirley (1963). Making Music: Leonard Bernstein. Chicago: Encyclopædia Britannica Press. .
 Briggs, John (1961). Leonard Bernstein: The Man, His Works and His World. World Publishing Co. .
 Burton, William W. (1995). Conversations about Bernstein. New York: Oxford University Press, New York. .
 
 Cone, Molly and Robert Galster (1970). Leonard Bernstein. New York: Thomas Y. Crowell Co. 
 Ewen, David (1960). Leonard Bernstein, A Biography for Young People. Philadelphia: Chilton Co. 
 Fluegel, Jane (ed.) (1991). Bernstein: Remembered: a life in pictures. New York: Carroll & Graf Publishers. .
 Freedland, Michael (1987). Leonard Bernstein. London, England: Harrap. Ltd. .
 
 Gottlieb, Jack (2010). Working With Bernstein. Amadeus Press. .
 Green, Diane Huss (1963). Lenny's Surprise Piano. San Carlos, California: Golden Gate Junior Books. .
 Hurwitz, Johanna (1963). Leonard Bernstein: A Passion of Music. Philadelphia: The Jewish Publication Society. .
 Ledbetter, Steven (1988). Sennets & Tuckets, A Bernstein Celebration. Boston: Boston Symphony Orchestra in association with David Godine Publisher. .
 Reidy, John P. & Norman Richards (1967). People of Destiny: Leonard Bernstein. Chicago: Children's Press. .
 Robinson, Paul (1982). Bernstein (The Art of Conducting Series). New York: Vanguard Press. .
 
 Shawn, Allen (2014). Leonard Bernstein: An American Musician. Yale University Press. .
 Wolfe, Tom (1987). Radical Chic and Mau Mauing the Flak Catchers''. New York: Farrar, Straus & Giroux. .

External links

 
 Leonard Bernstein at Sony Classical
 
 
 
 
 
 Composer's entry on IRCAM's database

Archival records
 Leonard Bernstein collection, circa 1900–1995, Library of Congress
 Bernstein Online Collection, Library of Congress
 Mildred Spiegel Zucker collection of Leonard Bernstein correspondence and related materials, 1936–1991, Library of Congress

1918 births
1990 deaths
20th-century American composers
20th-century American conductors (music)
20th-century American educators
20th-century American Jews
20th-century American male musicians
20th-century American philanthropists
20th-century classical composers
20th-century classical pianists
20th-century jazz composers
20th-century American LGBT people
American civil rights activists
American classical composers
American classical pianists
American expatriates in Austria
American film score composers
American jazz composers
American jazz pianists
American jazz songwriters
American LGBT songwriters
American male classical composers
American male classical pianists
American male conductors (music)
American male film score composers
American male jazz composers
American male jazz musicians
American music educators
American musical theatre composers
American opera composers
American operetta composers
American people of Russian-Jewish descent
American people of Ukrainian-Jewish descent
Analysands of Sándor Radó
ASCAP composers and authors
Ballet composers
Bisexual composers
Bisexual men
Bisexual songwriters
Bisexual Jews
Boston Latin School alumni
Brandeis University faculty
Broadway composers and lyricists
Burials at Green-Wood Cemetery
Classical musicians from Massachusetts
Classical musicians from New York (state)
Columbia Records artists
Commanders Crosses of the Order of Merit of the Federal Republic of Germany
Composers awarded knighthoods
Composers for piano
Composers from New York City
Conductors (music) awarded knighthoods
Curtis Institute of Music alumni
Deaths from cancer in New York (state)
Deaths from cardiovascular disease
Deaths from emphysema
Deaths from mesothelioma
Deaths from pneumonia in New York City
Deutsche Grammophon artists
Educators from Massachusetts
Educators from New York City
Ernst von Siemens Music Prize winners
Fellows of the American Academy of Arts and Sciences
George Peabody Medal winners
Grammy Award winners
Grammy Lifetime Achievement Award winners
Harvard Advocate alumni
Harvard College alumni
Jazz-influenced classical composers
Jazz musicians from Massachusetts
Jazz musicians from New York (state)
Jewish American classical composers
Jewish American film score composers
Jewish American jazz composers
Jewish American philanthropists
Jewish American songwriters
Jewish classical pianists
Jewish jazz musicians
Jewish opera composers
Kennedy Center honorees
Lecturers
LGBT classical composers
LGBT classical musicians
LGBT film score composers
LGBT jazz composers
LGBT people from Massachusetts
LGBT people from New York (state)
MacDowell Colony fellows
Male musical theatre composers
Male opera composers
Male operetta composers
Music directors of the New York Philharmonic
Musicians awarded knighthoods
Musicians from Boston
Musicians from New York City
People from Lawrence, Massachusetts
Philanthropists from Massachusetts
Philanthropists from New York (state)
Primetime Emmy Award winners
Pupils of Aaron Copland
Pupils of Edward Burlingame Hill
Pupils of Fritz Reiner
Pupils of Randall Thompson
Pupils of Serge Koussevitzky
Pupils of Walter Piston
Recipients of the Léonie Sonning Music Prize
Recipients of the Praemium Imperiale
Royal Philharmonic Society Gold Medallists
Songwriters from Massachusetts
Songwriters from New York (state)
Sony Classical Records artists
Special Tony Award recipients
Tanglewood Music Center faculty
Tony Award winners
American bisexual writers